Senziq (also Romanized as Senzīq, Sanazīq, and Sanzīq; also known as Sanzigh and Sinzik) is a village in Aghmiyun Rural District, in the Central District of Sarab County, East Azerbaijan Province, Iran. At the 2006 census, its population was 719, in 163 families.

References 

Populated places in Sarab County